Brazil is an unincorporated community in Tallahatchie County, Mississippi.

The community is also known as Lay and Stover.

Education
Brazil is in the West Tallahatchie School District. R. H. Bearden School and West Tallahatchie High School are the local schools.

It was previously a part of the Brazil Consolidated School District. Brazil formerly had its own school, with the final building built for $50,000 in 1936. In the 1940s the district made plans to build an expansion. The previous Brazil school was destroyed by a fire. Due to underenrollment, as the school had 40 students registered in 1965, it was closed that year. and the building put up for sale by the school district.

Coahoma Community College is the designated community college.

References

Unincorporated communities in Tallahatchie County, Mississippi
Unincorporated communities in Mississippi